The Europe/Africa Zone is one of three zones of regional competition in the 2007 Davis Cup.

Group I

Group II

Bulgaria, Norway, Latvia, and Poland relegated to Group III in 2008.
Estonia and Nigeria promoted to Group I in 2008.

Group III

Venue 1
Venue: Smash Tennis Academy, Cairo, Egypt (clay)
Date: 9–13 May

Top two teams advance to 1st–4th Play-off, bottom two teams advance to 5th–8th Play-off. Scores in italics carried over from pools.

Ireland and Egypt promoted to Group II in 2008.
San Marino and Iceland relegated to Group IV in 2008.

Venue 2
Venue: Avenir Sportif de la Marsa, Tunis, Tunisia (clay)
Date: 9–13 May

Top two teams advance to 1st–4th Play-off, bottom two teams advance to 5th–8th Play-off. Scores in italics carried over from pools.

Note: Ghana/Mauritius tie broken on percentage of sets won.

South Africa and Tunisia promoted to Group II in 2008.
Mauritius and Namibia relegated to Group IV in 2008.

Group IV
Venue: Yerevan, Armenia (clay)
Date: Week of 6 August
Withdrawn: Azerbaijan, Benin, Gabon, Libya, Malta, Senegal, Uganda

 Montenegro, Armenia, Botswana and Andorra promoted to Group III in 2008.

See also
Davis Cup structure

 
Europe Africa
Davis Cup Europe/Africa Zone